Noah Solskjær (born 8 June 2000) is a Norwegian footballer who plays as a midfielder for Spjelkavik. He is the son of former footballer Ole Gunnar Solskjær.

Early and personal life
His father is Ole Gunnar Solskjær, and he is the eldest of three children.

Career
Solskjær began his footballing career in the youth teams at Clausenengen, the same club his father began his career at. After playing for the B team, he made his debut for the Kristiansund first team in a friendly on 30 July 2019 against Manchester United, managed by father Ole Gunnar Solskjær.

On 9 September 2020, Solskjær signed his first professional contract with Kristiansund, until December 2021, having been part of their academy since 2014. Solskjær made his senior debut for Kristiansund on 1 November 2020, coming on as second-half substitute for Liridon Kalludra in a 3–2 defeat to top of the table Bodø/Glimt.

He moved on loan to Sogndal in April 2021. He was released after the 2021 season, signing for Spjelkavik in the summer of 2022.

Playing style
He has said he models his game on Michael Carrick. He has previously said his favourite player is Wayne Rooney.

Career statistics

References

2000 births
Living people
Sportspeople from Kristiansund
Norwegian footballers
Kristiansund BK players
Eliteserien players
Association football midfielders
Norwegian First Division players
Sogndal Fotball players
Spjelkavik IL players